Puging is a village near Yingkiong in Upper Siang district of Arunachal Pradesh

References

Villages in Upper Siang district